Kinzie is a surname. Notable people with the surname include:

George Kinzie Fitzsimons (born 1928), American prelate of the Roman Catholic Church
John H. Kinzie (1803–1865), the eldest son of John Kinzie, one of Chicago's first permanent settlers
John Kinzie (1763–1828), one of Chicago's first permanent European settlers
John Kinzie Clark (1792–1865), trader and trapper who was a prominent early settler in the Chicago area
Juliette Augusta Magill Kinzie (1806–1870), American, historian, writer and pioneer of the American midwest
Mary Kinzie (born 1944), United States poet
Walt Kinzie (1858–1909), American professional baseball player

See also
Kinzie (Northwestern Elevated station), station on the Chicago Transit Authority's Brown Line
Kinzie Street railroad bridge, single leaf bascule bridge across the Chicago River in downtown Chicago, Illinois